Constitutional Assembly elections were held in the Dominican Republic on 1 June 1929. The role of the Assembly was to review and amend certain articles of the constitution, which resulted in an amendment to repeal the ban on presidential re-elections. Voter turnout was low and in some places ballots were not even counted.

References

Dominican Republic
1929 in the Dominican Republic
Elections in the Dominican Republic
Election and referendum articles with incomplete results
June 1929 events